The Belgian UFO wave was a series of sightings of triangular UFOs in Belgium, which lasted from 29 November 1989 to April 1990.

The sightings
The Belgian UFO wave began in November 1989. Reports were filed, most many weeks after the events. Many of the reports related a large object flying at low altitude. Some reports also stated that the craft was of a flat, triangular shape, with lights underneath.

The Belgian UFO wave peaked with the events of the night of 30–31 March 1990. On that night, one unknown object was tracked on radar, and two Belgian Air Force F-16s were sent to investigate, with neither pilot reporting seeing the object. No reports were received from the public on the date. But over the next 2 weeks reports from 143 people who claimed to have witnessed the object were received, all of them after the event. Over the ensuing months, many others claimed to have witnessed these events as well. Following the incident, the Belgian Air Force released a report detailing the events of that night.

At around 23:00 on 30 March, the supervisor for the Control Reporting Center (CRC) at Glons received reports that three unusual lights were seen moving towards Thorembais-Gembloux, which lies to the southeast of Brussels. Glons CRC requested the Wavre gendarmerie send a patrol to confirm the sighting.

Approximately 10 minutes later, some later reports stated that a second set of lights were seen, moving towards the first triangle. Traffic Center Control at Semmerzake tracked one object only on its radar, and an order to scramble two F-16 fighters from Beauvechain Air Base was given. Throughout this time, in reports after the event, some people claim that the phenomenon was visible from the ground, describing the whole formation as maintaining their relative positions while moving slowly across the sky.

Over the next hour, the two scrambled F-16s attempted nine separate interceptions of the targets. On three occasions, they managed to obtain a radar lock for a few seconds, but these were later shown to be Radar-locks on each other. The pilots never reported seeing any of the claimed sightings, saw none of the claimed manoeuvres, and never got a lock on any objects apart from the other F16. The other contacts were all found to be the result of a well-known atmospheric interference called Bragg scattering.

After 00:30, radar contact became much more sporadic and the final confirmed lock took place at 00:40. Following several further unconfirmed contacts, the F-16s eventually returned to base shortly after 01:00.

Members of the Wavre gendarmerie who had been sent to confirm the original report, describe four lights now being arranged in a square formation, all making short jerky movements, before gradually losing their luminosity and disappearing in four separate directions at around 01:30. They also reported that a low engine noise was heard and that it seemed to have a stick coming out one end with a turbine on it, which has led many to conclude the object was a helicopter.

"Patrick M." hoax photograph

In April 1990, a hoax photo of a triangular object upon which three lights are visible at each corner was taken by an anonymous photographer. Since then, a man named Patrick M. has publicly admitted to creating the hoax "UFO" photograph.

Experts say there is no background in the photograph and no element that would allow calculation of  the object's size or distance from the camera. Wim van Utrecht has reproduced a copy of the photograph with devices. A computer graphics simulation method to reproduce the photograph was developed by a Belgian mathematician, Thierry Veyt at The University of Liège Laboratory of Astrophysics, wherein the apparent "shake" motion, that results in the lights of the craft appearing blurred or out of focus in the photograph contradicts eye-witness statements. This, along with the anonymity of the photographer and fact that the image was not produced publicly until 4 months after the alleged event, also brought the authenticity of the image into question.

For 20 years, the ufological organization Société belge d'étude des phénomènes spatiaux (SOBEPS) claimed that this picture was genuine. But on 26 July 2011, in an interview for RTL, a Belgian TV channel, Patrick M. explained that it was a hoax.

In his 27 September 2016, Skeptoid podcast episode titled "The Belgian UFO Wave," author Brian Dunning discussed the photographic evidence and said that the single photograph is emblematic of the quality of all the evidence that characterized the Belgian UFO wave. In 2011, Patrick Maréchal demonstrated how he had created the hoax UFO, by cuttting a piece of styrofoam into a triangle, painting it black, embedding a flashlight in each corner, and hanging it from a string.

Explanations

In 1992, about three years after the first sighting, which occurred on 29 November 1989, in Eupen, Marc Hallet wrote an essay about the Belgian UFO wave criticizing the work done by the SOBEPS: La Vague OVNI Belge ou le triomphe de la désinformation, arguing that this UFOlogical organisation was spreading misinformation in the media. Hallet's thesis is that the Belgian UFO wave was mostly a mass delusion, boosted by the work done by the SOBEPS. This mass delusion would have followed Philip J. Klass's law: "Once news coverage leads the public to believe that UFOs may be in the vicinity, there are numerous natural and man-made objects which, especially seen at night, can take on unusual characteristics in the minds of hopeful viewers. Their UFO reports in turn add to the mass excitement, which encourages still more observers to watch for UFOs. This situation feeds upon itself until such time as the media lose interest in the subject, and then the flap quickly runs out of steam."

In 1993, Pierre Magain and Marc Remy published an article in Physicalia Magazine, in which their conclusions don't match those from the SOBEPS. They also state that the Belgian UFO wave would be better studied by people in the human sciences than by physicists.

In The Belgian UFO Wave of 1989–1992 – A Neglected Hypothesis, Renaud Leclet & co. discuss the fact that some sightings can be explained by helicopters. Most witnesses reported that the objects were silent. This report argues that the lack of noise could be due to the engine noise in the witnesses' automobiles, or strong natural wind blowing away from the witnesses.  The report makes use of computer 
manipulated images of models (as admitted in the report) and stills from movies as evidence for making its theories fit the witness descriptions.

In his article The Beginning of the Belgian UFO wave, Jean-Michel Abrassart argues that the beginning of the wave does not contradict the psychosocial hypothesis, contrary to what the SOBEPS claimed in his work. In an article published on his website in 2011, The Belgian Wave and the photos of stuff, Auguste Meessen replied to several criticisms (by Roger Paquay and Jean-Michel Abrassart) and argues that, according to him, the Belgian UFO wave is completely unexplained. Roger Paquay and Jean-Michel Abrassart both wrote rebuttals to the Belgian physicist's article.

In "The Belgian UFO Wave" Skeptoid podcast episode, Brian Dunning discussed the F-16 chase and reported that

Regarding the "wave" of eye-witness reports and lack of photographic evidence, Dunning concludes

See also
 UFO sightings in Belgium
 List of UFO-related hoaxes
 Black triangle UFO

References

Further reading
 SOBEPS: Vague OVNI sur la Belgique (UFO wave over Belgium)
 Leslie Kean (2010):  UFOs: Generals, Pilots and Government Officials Go on the Record - with a foreword by John Podesta. .

External links
 Belgian UFO Wave Sightings at ufosightingstoday.org 
 Belgian UFO wave at Ufos.about.com
 Belgian UFO wave at Ufocasebook
 Belgium 1990: A Case for Radar-Visual UFOS? – Tim Printy
 Skeptic Report
 Triangles over Belgium (Wim Van Utrecht)
 "Classic" UFO Photo from Belgian Wave – the Hoaxer Confesses
 Belgian UFO wave at Latest UFO sightings 
 David Marler's UFO book, Belleville News Democrat 7/14/13

Alleged UFO-related aviation incidents
General Dynamics F-16 Fighting Falcon
UFO sightings
1989 in Belgium
1990 in Belgium
Photography forgeries
Historical events in Belgium